The 1942 Vermont gubernatorial election took place on November 3, 1942. Incumbent Republican William H. Wills ran successfully for re-election to a second term as Governor of Vermont, defeating Democratic candidate Park H. Pollard.

Republican primary

Results

Democratic primary

Results

General election
William H. Wills, incumbent Governor of Vermont
Park Pollard, Chairman of the Vermont Democratic Party and former state representative

Results

References

Vermont
1942
Gubernatorial
November 1942 events